Robert Malinowski (1 March 1957 – 13 December 2021) was a Polish volleyball player. He competed at the 1980 Summer Olympics.

References

External links
 

1957 births
2021 deaths
Volleyball players from Warsaw
Polish men's volleyball players
Olympic volleyball players of Poland
Volleyball players at the 1980 Summer Olympics
Legia Warsaw (volleyball) players